"Cry No More" is a hip hop song by hip hop artist Shareefa. It is the second and final single from her debut album, Point of No Return. The single was produced by Darkchild and samples The Stylistics' "The Miracle", and contains an interpolation of "Soul Survivor" by Young Jeezy and Akon. It was released in November 2006. The video for this single premiered on BET's Access Granted on November 1, 2006. The video features Young Buck.

Song information
"Cry No More" is about a woman in an unhealthy relationship. Her man cheats on her and she always cries. In the song, she sings that she can't cry anymore because she is over and through with her ex-boyfriend. Because she has a lot on her mind, she has no time to cry over him.

Charts

2006 singles
Music videos directed by Melina Matsoukas
Shareefa songs
Song recordings produced by Rodney Jerkins
Songs written by Rodney Jerkins
Songs written by George David Weiss
Songs written by Hugo Peretti
Songs written by Luigi Creatore